Jere Sallinen (born October 26, 1990) is a Finnish professional ice hockey winger who is currently playing with EHC Biel of the National League (NL). He was originally selected by the Minnesota Wild in the 6th round (163rd overall) of the 2009 NHL Entry Draft. His older brother Tomi also plays professional hockey in Europe.

Playing career
Sallinen played youth hockey within the Espoo Blues organization, before making his senior debut with the club in the 2007–08 season. Sallinen was a late round selection in the 2009 NHL draft for the Minnesota Wild, however opted to continue his professional career in Europe. In the midst of his fifth season with Espoo, while still attempting to establish himself at the SM-liiga level, he was loaned to fellow Finnish club, HPK to finish out the 2011–12 season.

On May 2, 2012, Sallinen made the move to HPK permanent from the Blues on a two-year deal. He responded instantly to his new club in breaking out with a career high 15 goals and 42 points in 57 games for the 2012–13 season. In the final year of his contract with HPK, Sallinen was unable to reproduce his offensive presence from the previous campaign and was a late season transfer candidate in agreeing to move to the Swedish Hockey League with Örebro HK on February 21, 2014.

After 6 games and helping Örebro HK avoid relegation, Sallinen as a free agent agreed to sign with Finnish Kontinental Hockey League entrant, Jokerit on a two-year deal on April 14, 2014. Over two seasons with Jokerit, Sallinen appeared in 98 regular season KHL games with the club for 34 points.

Following Jokerit's surprise first round defeat to Torpedo Nizhny Novgorod in the 2015–16 season, Sallinen as a free agent agreed to pursue an NHL career in signing a one-year entry-level contract with the Edmonton Oilers on March 13, 2016.  In the 2016–17 season, Sallinen was unable to make an impact in North America, registering just 10 points in 53 games with the Oilers American Hockey League affiliate, the Bakersfield Condors.

With the Condors unable to gain a post-season berth, Sallinen as an impending free agent opted to return to Sweden for a second stint with Örebro HK of the SHL. He signed a two-year contract on May 12, 2017.

At the conclusion of his contract in Sweden, Sallinen returned to the Liiga in Finland, agreeing to an optional two-year deal with HIFK on 7 May 2019.

On June 18, 2021, Sallinen joined EHC Biel of the National League (NL) on a one-year deal.

Career statistics

Regular season and playoffs

International

References

External links

1990 births
Living people
Bakersfield Condors players
EHC Biel players
Espoo Blues players
HIFK (ice hockey) players
HPK players
Jokerit players
Jokipojat players
Minnesota Wild draft picks
Örebro HK players
Sportspeople from Espoo
Finnish ice hockey left wingers